Deadline, published by Orbit Books in 2011, is the second book in the Newsflesh Trilogy, a science fiction/horror series written by Seanan McGuire under the pen name Mira Grant. Deadline is preceded by Feed (2010) and succeeded by Blackout (2012).

Set after a zombie apocalypse and written from the perspective of blog journalist Shaun Mason, Deadline delves deeper into the conspiracy unveiled during the events of Feed (2010), while depicting Shaun's attempts to deal with the loss of his sister Georgia. Deadline delves more into the origins of the zombie-causing virus, and how humanity is responding to it on societal, biological, and psychological levels.

Reviews of Deadline have highlighted the book's improvements over Feed and McGuire's avoidance of the problems normally associated with the middle work of a trilogy. There is particular praise for the characterisation of Shaun and his attempts to deal with the loss of a loved one along with the ever-growing crisis. Deadline was nominated for the 2012 Hugo Award for Best Novel.

Plot
Deadline is set several decades after the zombie apocalypse, the Rising. Most humans reside in controlled zones, with rigorous blood testing and decontamination used to stop the live KA virus from spreading. Bloggers, in this universe are respected, credentialed journalists  (generally divided up as the fact-based "Newsies", the Steve Irwin-inspired "Irwins", and the entertaining "Fictionals") providing news and entertainment. A year after the events of Feed, Shaun Mason is still coming to terms with having had to kill his infected sister, Georgia, and has stepped back from his role as an Irwin to head After the End Times, in an administrative role.

After returning to Oakland, California, after a field excursion with Rebecca "Becks" Atherton (Shaun's replacement as the site's top Irwin), Alaric Kwong (a Newsie), and Dave Novakowski (another Irwin), Shaun receives a visit from Dr. Kelly Connolly, a Centers for Disease Control (CDC) researcher. Kelly had faked her death using a clone after her colleagues, researching the abnormally high death rate among people with "reservoir conditions" (in whom the active virus is present but confined to one part of the host's body, a condition Georgia had while alive), began dying at a suspiciously high rate: actions possibly linked to the conspiracy uncovered in the previous book. As they discuss this, a sizable zombie outbreak occurs; Dave overrides the lockdown so the others can escape but dies when the site is firebombed.

The team flees to Weed, California, where Magdalene "Maggie" Garcia, billionaire pharmaceutical company heiress and head Fictional at After the End Times, lives. They track down a non-CDC laboratory in Portland, Oregon and head there to learn more about Kelly's findings. A rogue researcher, Dr. Shannon Abbey, reveals that reservoir conditions are an immune response to the virus, and those with the conditions may fight off zombification. Shaun and Becks then head to Portland's CDC office, where they escape a zombie outbreak staged to kill them. The group next returns to Maggie's, and Shaun sends the collected data to Mahir Gowda (a British resident and the website's head Newsie), hoping he can find independent verification.

A fortnight later, Mahir arrives unannounced with news that all Kellis-Amberlee substrains were lab-engineered, and people with reservoir conditions are being killed off before each new substrain appears. Armed with this information, Shaun leads Kelly, Becks, and Mahir to the CDC office in Memphis, Tennessee, to break in and confront Kelly's boss, Joseph Wynne. Dr. Wynne reveals he organised the Oakland outbreak to kill Kelly and the bloggers; he is part of a widespread conspiracy to keep people afraid and compliant while the zombie virus is stabilised. In the following struggle, Dr. Wynne is killed, and Kelly is infected with the live virus. She sacrifices herself to distract security while the others escape. The team heads back to California, driving through a hurricane and finding most of the country deserted.

On reaching Maggie's, Shaun and company learn that most of the country has been locked down following massive outbreaks along the Gulf Coast: a Second Rising. Shaun figures out that the cause is not an airborne strain of live virus as most fear, but it is now being transmitted by mosquitoes. He confirms this with Dr. Abbey and receives an offer to join her in Shady Cove, Oregon. Shaun and Mahir organise the rest of the site's staff to propagate what they have learned, before those at Maggie's evacuate. Shortly before reaching Shady Cove, Shaun is attacked and bitten, and is quarantined in Abbey's lab. Despite several tests, he shows no sign of becoming a zombie. The novel's coda reveals that despite her apparent death, Georgia is somehow alive and well in an unknown CDC facility.

Background and themes
Without the framing device of a United States presidential election to use as in Feed (waiting for the next election would have left too much time for the characters' emotional wounds to heal), McGuire chose to focus more on the zombie virus itself: how a lab-engineered virus developed and evolved, and how humans were responding to it, on both societal and biological levels. McGuire also wanted to address the long-term impact of a zombie apocalypse on society and the associated psychological ramifications. Other themes covered in the novel include medical ethics and human responsibility.

Deadline was published in May 2011. The novel was originally to be titled Blackout, but this was changed shortly before publishing to avoid confusion with Connie Willis' novel Blackout (2010), published a year earlier. Grant instead used Blackout as the title for the third Newsflesh novel.

Reception
In reviewing the novel for SFFWorld, Rob Bedford described the book as avoiding the pitfalls normally associated with the middle work in a trilogy and praised McGuire's strong pacing despite the novel's length. Bedford also compliments the author's treatment of the subject of medical ethics (particularly in extreme situations) as well handled and thought-provoking. Selena MacIntosh of Persephone Magazine noted several improvements over Feed, particularly tighter plotting and storytelling, along with deeper characters. However, as MacIntosh was less impressed overall with the first novel, she passes some of the credit for Deadlines success to a new editor McGuire notes was previously uninvolved. In the Seattle Post-Intelligencer, Brian Fitzpatrick wrote McGuire takes the "political intrigue of Feed and ratchets it up to 11" and highly praised the novel's conclusion. He also states that the use of zombies as the means of a hidden agenda make the work scarier than the straightforward "humans versus zombies" scenario in other zombie fiction.

The use of the deceased Georgia as an advisory voice in the slightly unhinged Shaun's head was praised by reviewers: Bedford called it a "great tool to use for internal dialogue" and congratulated McGuire for her ability to set different tones for the two characters, while MacIntosh and Fitzpatrick identified it as a plausible and understandable reaction to the loss of a loved one. MacIntosh also liked the decision to make Shaun "a real tool" as he struggles to deal with both the loss of his sister and the growing conspiracy, with his "raw and messy" state making him a more interesting protagonist than Georgia was in Feed.

The book was compared favourably with Max Brooks' World War Z (2006). Deadline was nominated for the 2012 Hugo Award for Best Novel but lost to Among Others (2011) by Jo Walton.

References

Novels by Seanan McGuire
2011 American novels
American zombie novels
American post-apocalyptic novels
Orbit Books books